Tiel is a municipality and a town in the middle of the Netherlands. The town is enclosed by the Waal river and the Linge river to the South and the North, and the Amsterdam-Rhine Canal to the East. Tiel comprises the population centres Kapel-Avezaath, Tiel and Wadenoijen. The city was founded in the 5th century CE.

The town of Tiel 

Tiel is the largest town in the Betuwe area, which is famous for being one of the centres of Dutch fruit production. Orchards in the area produce apples, pears, plums and cherries. Tiel once housed the famous jam factory De Betuwe. After production was moved to Breda in 1993, the entire complex was demolished, although a part was reconstructed later. Reminding of this industry is a jam manufacturing museum and a statue of Flipje, the raspberry-based comic figure who starred in De Betuwe's, jam factory advertisements since the 1930s.

Originally located on the Linge river Tiel became an important centre of trade in the early Middle Ages, especially after the demise of Dorestad in the 9th century. Tiel had two big churches, one of which, the St. Walburg, was a collegiate church that belonged to the Teutonic Knights and vanished after the Reformation while the other church, the St. Maarten, became Protestant. Much of the historic centre was destroyed during the Second World War.

Every year, on the third Saturday in September, a festival known as Fruitcorso is held to celebrate the fruit harvest from the Betuwe area. On this day, a parade of wagons, decorated with fruit, travels through the city. Appelpop is a free, two-day music event that is held yearly on the second Friday and Saturday of September.

Tiel has also been known for its pewter industry. The last pewter factory and museum, which mainly produced collectibles for tourists, went bankrupt in early 2004, but has since been revived.

Notable people, born in Tiel

Public service 
 Joan van der Capellen tot den Pol (1741–1784) statesman, active in the Batavian Republic
 David Hendrik Chassé (1765–1849) soldier who fought both for and against Napoleon
 Theodoor Gerard van Lidth de Jeude (1788–1863) physician, veterinarian and zoologist
 Antonie Frederik Jan Floris Jacob van Omphal (1788–1863) lieutenant-general and extraordinary aide-de-camp to William III of the Netherlands
 Cornelis Pijnacker Hordijk (1847–1908) jurist and politician, Governor-General of the Dutch East Indies 1888/1893
 William Hendriksen (1900–1982) New Testament scholar and writer of Bible commentaries
 Marinus van IJzendoorn (born 1952) human development professor, co-leader of Generation R

The arts 
 Annie Foore (1847–1890) writer who lived in Dutch East Indies
 Mary Dresselhuys (1907–2004) stage actress
 Eylem Aladogan (born 1975) installation artist and sculptor
 Frans Duijts (born 1979) singer
 Abdellah Dami (born 1982) journalist, presenter and writer
 Corrie van Binsbergen (born 1957) jazzmusician and composer

Sport 

 Herman Claudius van Riemsdijk (born 1948) chess player
 Jan van Deinsen (born 1953) football player
 Nico Rienks (born 1962) rower, two-time gold medallist at the 1988 and 1996 Summer Olympics
 Anton Janssen (born 1963) football player
 Wilma van Velsen (born 1964) swimmer and team bronze and silver medallist in the 1980 and 1984 Summer Olympics
 Dirk Jan Derksen (born 1972) football player
 Bobbie Traksel (born 1981) racing cyclist
 Erik Pieters (born 1988) football player
 Barry Maguire (born 1989) football player

Gallery

References

External links 

 
Municipalities of Gelderland
Populated places in Gelderland
Cities in the Netherlands